Liberal Citizens Action (ACL) was a political party in Spain at the time of its transition to democracy. ACL emerged from the Liberal Federation, an alliance of five parties, in 1977. The president of the party was José María de Areilza, Minister of Foreign Affairs from 1975 to 1976. Areilza had left Adolfo Suarez's Union of the Democratic Centre (UCD).

In the 1979 elections ACL was part of the Democratic Coalition, together with Manuel Fraga's People's Alliance (AP). Areilza was elected deputy in Madrid.

Shortly afterwards, ACL merged with the AP.

Electoral performance

Cortes Generales

References

Liberal parties in Spain
Political parties established in 1977
Political parties disestablished in 1979